Spring Branch Independent School District is a school district headquartered in Hedwig Village, Texas, United States in Greater Houston. The district serves portions of western Houston, including most of Spring Branch. It also serves several small municipalities known as the Memorial Villages in its jurisdiction, such as Hedwig Village and Spring Valley Village. A majority of the district lies within Houston city limits.

The school district's boundaries include Hempstead Road to the northeast (formerly US 290), Interstate 610 to the east, Clay Road to the north, the Addicks Dam to the west, and Buffalo Bayou to the south. Spring Branch serves 35,000 kindergarten through 12th grade students and includes a region with 188,000 residents.

The Spring Branch ISD area is served by the Houston Community College System, but it is not within the tax base.

SBISD is not to be confused with the Spring Independent School District, also located in the Greater Houston area (the latter is located in the northern portion of the region).

There are currently four traditional high schools (grades 9-12), one of which is 6A, and three 5A high schools, eight middle schools (grades 6-8), and twenty-six elementary schools (grades K-5), and six early education Pre-K centers in the district. Three more high school centers serve students in grades 9-12 with various purposes, including one public charter school.

In 2009, the school district was rated "academically acceptable" by the Texas Education Agency.

History

The school district originated from the Spring Branch School Society, which was sponsored by the St. Peter's Church in 1856. The first school opened in 1889. By 1905, the white school had one teacher with 49 pupils and the black school had one teacher with 29 pupils.

The area did not become urban until the expansion of Houston city limits in the 1950s, which followed a failed attempt by the entire Spring Branch region to incorporate into a single entity, leading to the establishment of the Memorial Villages. 
  Beginning in the mid-1950s and continuing through the mid-1970s, the school district expanded rapidly.  By 1976, the school district had approximately 45,000 students.

In 1979, The New York Times said that the district was "highly regarded".

As the district moved into the 1980s, the number of students attending SBISD schools dropped precipitously, leaving a number of facilities underutilized.  By the 1984-85 school year, the student population had dropped from its mid-1970s peak of over 40,000 to approximately 26,844.  That year, the school board voted to consolidate certain schools at the end of school year, closing Spring Branch and Westchester Senior High Schools, along with Westchester and Northbrook Junior High Schools.  (Northbrook Junior High School was later re-opened in 1991 as Northbrook Middle School.)

Hal Guthrie became superintendent in 1986 and retired in 2001. During Guthrie's term, an influx of Hispanic and low income students entered the district. By 2001, SBISD established free preschool for students at eligible lower income levels, as well as for students needing ESL or special education services. Melanie Markley of the Houston Chronicle wrote that Guthrie "not only guided the district back to health, but his retirement this year caps the end of a career that many say has earned Spring Branch a reputation as a trailblazer."

In 2009, SBISD began a partnership with Houston Community College Northwest, allowing students to take community college credit. Each student may earn up to 30 credits while enrolled at an SBISD school.

In 2015 two sections of Thornwood, two and three, currently served by the Katy Independent School District, proposed being removed from Katy ISD and placed in Spring Branch ISD, but both KISD and SBISD's boards denied the proposal.

Governance
Spring Branch ISD is led by a Superintendent of Schools, Dr. Jennifer Blaine, Ed.D., chosen by the Board of Trustees, headed by President Pam Goodson. The Board of Trustees is elected by voters living in Spring Branch ISD.

Student body

In 2001 SBISD had 32,000 students. SBISD's student body was 48% Hispanic, 39% White, 7% Asian, and 6% African American. By 2002 over half of the district's student body consisted of Hispanic and Latino Americans.

As of 2001, most students north of Interstate 10 are Hispanic and lower to middle income, while most students south of Interstate 10 are White and middle to upper income.

In 2008 it had 32,000 students.

In 2009 55% of SBISD students qualified for free or reduced lunch.

In 2018, SBISD had approximately 35,000 students.

SBISD cities

SBISD covers all of the following cities:
 Bunker Hill Village
 Hedwig Village
 Hilshire Village
 Spring Valley Village
SBISD covers portions of the following cities:
 Houston (portions around the villages)
 Hunters Creek Village (areas north of Buffalo Bayou)
 Piney Point Village (areas north of Buffalo Bayou)

Schools

K-12 Schools
Spring Branch Academic Institute (Houston, Choice)
Previously known as The Spring Branch School for Highly Gifted Students
The school uses Thornwood, Spring Forest Middle School, and Stratford High School as host campuses.
Frostwood Elementary

Secondary schools
6-12 Schools
Phoenix Academy (Spring Valley Village, Choice)
The school uses Academy of Choice as a host campus.
Westchester Academy for International Studies (Houston, Choice)
National Blue Ribbon School in 2011-12
Campus was previously used to host Westchester High School.

High Schools
Memorial High School (Hedwig Village, Zoned)
Northbrook High School (Houston, Zoned)
Spring Woods High School (Houston, Zoned)
Stratford High School (Houston, Zoned)
Virtual High School
YES Prep @ Northbrook High School (Houston, Charter)
The school uses Northbrook High School as a host campus.

Middle Schools
Cornerstone Academy (Spring Valley Village, Charter)
KIPP Courage College Prep @ Landrum Middle School (Houston, Charter)
The school uses Landrom Middle School as a host campus.
Landrum Middle School (Houston, Zoned)
In 1956 the original Landrum campus opened. Groundbreaking for a new campus occurred on November 12, 2019 as part of a 2017 bond. The new campus opened in June 2021.
Memorial Middle School (Houston, Zoned)
National Blue Ribbon School in 1988-89
Northbrook Middle School (Houston, Zoned)
National Blue Ribbon School in 1994-96
Spring Branch Middle School (Hedwig Village, Zoned)
National Blue Ribbon School in 1997-98
Spring Forest Middle School (Houston, Zoned)
National Blue Ribbon School in 1994-96
Spring Oaks Middle School (Houston, Zoned)
National Blue Ribbon School in 1994-96
Spring Woods Middle School (Houston, Zoned)
YES Prep @ Northbrook Middle School (Houston, Charter)
The school uses Northbrook Middle School as a host campus.

Other Schools
The Guthrie Center (Houston, Career & Technical Center)
Academy of Choice (Spring Valley Village, Alternative Education Campus)

Primary schools

Elementary schools
Buffalo Creek Elementary School (Houston, Zoned)
Bunker Hill Elementary School (Bunker Hill Village, Zoned)
1991-92 National Blue Ribbon School
Cedar Brook Elementary School (Houston, Zoned)
The current campus was built in 1992. A groundbreaking for its addition will be held on December 11, 2019, and the addition's scheduled opening is August 2021.
Edgewood Elementary School (Houston, Zoned)
Frostwood Elementary School (Bunker Hill Village, Zoned)
National Blue Ribbon School in 1989-90, 2005
Hollibrook Elementary School (Houston, Zoned)
Housman Elementary School (Houston, Zoned)
Hunters Creek Elementary School (Hunters Creek Village, Zoned)
In 1954 the current Hunters Creek school opened. The district will open a new school building in August 2021. Its groundbreaking occurred on November 19, 2019.
National Blue Ribbon School in 1993-94
Meadow Wood Elementary School (Houston, Zoned)
Memorial Drive Elementary School (Piney Point Village, Zoned)
National Blue Ribbon School in 1996-97
The school is used regularly to host City Council meetings.
Nottingham Elementary School (Houston, Zoned) - Located in Nottingham Forest VIII
National Blue Ribbon School in 1991-92
Pine Shadows Elementary School (Houston, Zoned)
Ridgecrest Elementary School (Houston, Zoned)
Rummel Creek Elementary School (Houston, Zoned)
National Blue Ribbon School in 1985-86
Shadow Oaks Elementary School (Houston, Zoned)
Sherwood Elementary School (Houston, Zoned)
In 2007 Sherwood was the only SBISD school to get a Texas Education Agency ranking of "unacceptable." In 2008 it gained a "recognized" rating.
Spring Branch Elementary School (Houston, Zoned)
In 1998 Spring Branch Elementary had a mostly Hispanic student body. During that year the Texas Education Agency ranked the school as "recognized." 55% of the students were exempted from taking the Texas Assessment of Knowledge and Skills (TAKS). 20% took the test, but their scores did not factor into the state's ranking since the students were new to the school district.
Spring Shadows Elementary School (Houston, Zoned)
National Blue Ribbon School in 1996-97
Terrace Elementary School (Houston, Zoned)
Thornwood Elementary School (Houston, Zoned)
Treasure Forest Elementary School (Houston, Zoned)
Valley Oaks Elementary School (Houston, Zoned)
Westwood Elementary School (Houston, Zoned)
Wilchester Elementary School (Houston, Zoned)
National Blue Ribbon School in 1989-90
Woodview Elementary School (Houston, Zoned)

Other schools
Bendwood School for GT and Special Ed Students (Houston)
Campus was previously used to host Bendwood Elementary School.

Pre-kindergarten schools
Bear Boulevard School (Spring Valley Village)
Early Childhood Collaborative
Lion Lane School (Houston)
Panda Path School (Houston)
Tiger Trail School (Houston)
Wildcat Way School (Houston)

Former schools
 Spring Branch High School (Became Cornerstone Academy/Spring Branch School of Choice.)
 Westchester Junior High (After closing, the school building was torn down in the 1990s to make way for an office building.)
 Westchester High School (Served as a campus of Houston Community College before being reopened as Westchester Academy.)
 Bendwood Elementary School (Now serves as the Bendwood School for GT students and special ed students)

See also

List of school districts in Texas

References

External links

Spring Branch ISD website

 
School districts in Houston
School districts in Harris County, Texas
Harris County, Texas
Spring Branch, Houston
1889 establishments in Texas